The 2003 Indianapolis Colts season was the 51st season for the team in the National Football League and 20th in Indianapolis. The Colts improved on their 10–6 record from 2002, going 12-4 and reached the postseason for the second straight season. After the season, quarterback Peyton Manning was named league MVP along with Steve McNair of Tennessee.

After defeating the Broncos and the Chiefs in the first two rounds, the Colts lost to the New England Patriots in the AFC title game, which saw the first playoff meeting between Tom Brady and Peyton Manning. New England defeated the Carolina Panthers in Super Bowl XXXVIII.

Offseason

NFL draft

Undrafted free agents

Roster

Regular season

Schedule

Note:  Division opponents in bold text.

Standings

Game summaries

Week 1: at Cleveland Browns 

The Colts had high expectations leading into the 2003 season, and hoped to start the season on the right track after a humiliating loss the New York Jets in the 2002 AFC Divisional Playoffs. Peyton Manning struggled for most of the game, throwing two interceptions in the first half.  Kelly Holcomb and the Cleveland Browns suffered from similar problems, however, as Holcomb twice drove the Browns inside of the Indianapolis ten yard line, but failed to score a touchdown on either drive.  With the game tied 6–6 in the fourth quarter, Manning flawlessly drove the Colts from their own 8 yard line to the Cleveland 25, the highlight of the drive being a 15-yard connection to wide receiver Reggie Wayne on a 3rd and 10 situation.  With six seconds left, coach Tony Dungy called timeout and sent in kicker Mike Vanderjagt to attempt the game-winning field goal, which he connected on.  This kick was Vanderjagt's first game winner since being labeled as an idiot kicker by Manning in the offseason after charging that Manning needed to show more emotion in games.

Week 2: vs. Tennessee Titans

Week 3: vs. Jacksonville Jaguars 

After being down 3–0 at halftime, the Colts scored 17 third quarter points followed by six points in the fourth quarter to beat Jacksonville 23-13 and improve to 3–0.

Week 4: at New Orleans Saints 

The Colts offense was nearly flawless as Peyton Manning and Marvin Harrison hooked up six times for 158 yards and three touchdowns.  Harrison accounted for half of Manning's 308 passing yards while Ricky Williams, Marcus Pollard, and Dallas Clark threw in good receiving days as well. The Colts rushing attack was not as strong without Edgerrin James but Indianapolis still picked up 101 yards on the ground.

Week 5: at Tampa Bay Buccaneers 

In Tampa on Monday Night, the Bucs scored 21 unanswered points and held a 35–14 lead with 5:09 remaining.  The game began to change hands when Brad Pyatt returned the ensuing kickoff 90 yards.  James Mungro scored a short touchdown, the Colts recovered an onside kick, and Peyton Manning threw a touchdown to Marvin Harrison to cut the lead to a touchdown.  With 35 seconds left, Ricky Williams scored a touchdown from 3 yards out to tie the game.  With four minutes to go in overtime, Mike Vanderjagt missed a potential game-winning 40 yard field goal wide right, but it was called back by a rare leaping penalty when Bucs DE Simeon Rice landed on his own player.  Vanderjagt's ensuing 29 yard attempt was blocked, but kept going and bounced off the right upright and through the posts.

Week 6: vs. Carolina Panthers

Week 8: vs. Houston Texans

Week 9: at Miami Dolphins

Week 10: at Jacksonville Jaguars

Week 11: vs. New York Jets

Week 12: at Buffalo Bills

Week 13: vs. New England Patriots

The Colts hosted the Patriots in the first meeting between the two clubs since October 2001 and the first meeting since divisional realignment took the Colts out of the AFC East into the AFC South.  With both teams at 9–2 it was the latest in a season in which two teams with no more than two losses had ever met.  The Patriots opened up with a flurry; an Adam Vinatieri field goal was followed by the sacking of Peyton Manning and a fumble recovery, followed by a Mike Cloud rushing score.  Dedric Ward then caught a 31-yard Tom Brady touchdown throw for a 17–0 Patriots lead.  Peyton Manning led two scoring drives that left the score 17–10 New England with 12 seconds in the first half, but on the ensuing kick to end the half Bethel Johnson ran the ball back for a 92-yard touchdown.

The Patriots increased their lead to 31–10 on another Cloud rushing score, but the tide turned decisively as Brady threw two picks late in the third quarter; Manning completed a 13-yard touchdown to Reggie Wayne on fourth down, then found Marvin Harrison for a 23-yard score.  A six-yard Troy Walters touchdown catch in the fourth tied the game at 31, then Bethel Johnson had another huge kickoff return, setting up a 13-yard Brady to Deion Branch touchdown.  Kevin Faulk was then steamrolled in the Pats' redzone and fumbled the ball, leading to a 29-yard Mike Vanderjagt kick and a 38–34 Patriots lead.  The Patriots were forced to punt in the final minutes and Ken Walter laid a huge egg as his punt landed at the 50.  The Colts drove to the Patriots 2-yard line entering the final minute and Patriots linebacker Willie McGinest suffered a momentary leg injury that necessitated stopping the clock.  On first down Edgerrin James was stopped at the 1; on second he was stopped and Manning called the Colts' final timeout; on third he threw to the left side of the endzone but the ball sailed over everyone's heads; finally on fourth with 15 seconds remaining James was stopped at the 1 by McGinest, Ted Washington, and Rodney Harrison.  The 38–34 thriller left the Patriots shaken ("I've never seen anything like it," Rodney Harrison said afterward) and left them 10–2 and the Colts 9–3.

Week 14: at Tennessee Titans

Week 15: vs. Atlanta Falcons

Week 16: vs. Denver Broncos

Week 17: at Houston Texans

Postseason

Game summaries

AFC Wild Card: vs. Denver Broncos

AFC Divisional Playoff: at Kansas City Chiefs

This offensive shootout became the second game without a punt in NFL history, and first since the Buffalo Bills played the San Francisco 49ers in 1992.  Colts quarterback Peyton Manning threw for 304 yards and three touchdowns, while Edgerrin James ran for a career postseason high 125 yards and two scores. On the Kansas City side, Dante Hall caught a touchdown and returned a kickoff for another; and Priest Holmes, who set the regular-season rushing touchdown record, rushed for 176 yards, caught 5 passes for 32 yards, and scored twice.  Kansas City quarterback Trent Green threw for 212 yards and a touchdown while also rushing for 18 yards in his first career postseason game. The Chiefs defense failed to stop the Colt's offense. Kansas City's defensive coordinator Greg Robinson was asked to resign the following week.

AFC Championship: at New England Patriots

Awards and records
 Peyton Manning, Bert Bell Award

See also
History of the Indianapolis Colts
Indianapolis Colts seasons
Colts–Patriots rivalry

References

Indianapolis Colts
Indianapolis Colts seasons
AFC South championship seasons
Colts